Matthew Holland, also known as Matt Holland (born 22 June 1989, in Carshalton) is a British water polo goalkeeper. At the 2012 Summer Olympics, he competed for the Great Britain men's national water polo team in the men's event. He is 6 ft 4 inches tall.

At club level, he played with Spanish team Navarra in División de Honor.. He also played in Holland and France before competing for Sutton & Cheam.

See also
 Great Britain men's Olympic water polo team records and statistics
 List of men's Olympic water polo tournament goalkeepers

References

External links
 

1989 births
Living people
Water polo goalkeepers
British male water polo players
Olympic water polo players of Great Britain
Water polo players at the 2012 Summer Olympics
People from Carshalton
Sportspeople from London